The Directors Guild of America Award for Outstanding Directorial Achievement in Documentaries is one of the annual Directors Guild of America Awards given by the Directors Guild of America. It was first awarded at the 44th Directors Guild of America Awards in 1992.

Winners and nominees

1990s

2000s

2010s

2020s

Multiple wins and nominations

See also
Academy Award for Best Documentary Feature

References

External links
  (official website)

Directors Guild of America Awards
American documentary film awards
Awards established in 1991